The 2017 Indonesian Basketball League is the second season of the Starting5 as a promoter of the league.

Pelita Jaya defeated Satria Muda Pertamina 3–1 in the final. This accomplishment was noteworthy as some of the team's best players had recently departed. These players included Andy Batam, Dimas Aryo Dewanto, and Kelly Purwanto.

Team

Transactions

Coach

Players

Draft 2017

Format 
Teams were divided into two groups: The White Group and the Red Group. 
 Teams in the White Group played around 15-16 games; while in the Red Group played around 13-14 games.
 At the end of the classification round, the top three teams in each group will advance to the playoffs where the group winners will advance to the semifinals.
 The whole playoffs will be in a best-of-three format.

Regular season

White Group

Red Group

Playoffs 
The whole playoffs are in a best-of-three series.

Quarterfinals

Awards

References

Sources 
 http://mainbasket.com/2017/01/roster-lengkap-ibl-2017/

League
Indonesia